Jean-Pierre "Jim" Graser (9 November 1914, in Gonderange – 2 March 1979) was a Luxembourgian boxer who competed in the 1936 Summer Olympics.

In 1936 he was eliminated in the second round of the light heavyweight class after losing his fight to the eventual bronze medalist Francisco Risiglione.

1936 Olympic results
Below is the record of Jean-Pierre Graser, a Luxembourgian light heavyweight boxer who competed at the 1936 Berlin Olympics:

 Round of 32: bye
 Round of 16: lost to Francisco Risiglione (Argentina) by decision

External links
 profile
 Jean-Pierre Graser's profile at Sports Reference.com

1914 births
1979 deaths
People from Grevenmacher (canton)
Luxembourgian male boxers
Light-heavyweight boxers
Olympic boxers of Luxembourg
Boxers at the 1936 Summer Olympics